Egor Afanasyev (born 23 January 2001) is a Russian professional ice hockey winger currently playing for the Nashville Predators of the National Hockey League (NHL). He was selected in the second round of the 2019 NHL Entry Draft, 45th overall, by the Predators.

Playing career
Afanasyev as a Moscow native began his junior development by moving to North America and playing in Michigan with Little Caesers under-16 team in the HPHL before he was selected 156th overall in the 2017 USHL Fuutres Draft by the Muskegon Lumberjacks.

In his second season with the Lumberjacks in 2018–19 season, developing as a large-framed winger that could overpower defenders, he led Muskegon with 27 goals and 35 assists for 62 points and was named to the USHL's Third All-Star team. On the back of his impressive season, Afanasyev was then selected by the Nashville Predators in the second-round, 45th overall, of the 2019 NHL Entry Draft.

Continuing his career in the North America, Afanasyev moved to Canada to play major junior hockey with the Windsor Spitfires of the Ontario Hockey League (OHL) for the 2019–20 season. Signing with the Spitfires after the club had previously acquired his rights from the Ottawa 67's, Afanasyev instantly made an impact with the team in notching a team leading 31 goals and co-leading alongside Tyler Angle with 67 points in just 62 regular season games. He was signed by the Predators during his tenure with the Spitfires, agreeing to a three-year, entry-level contract on 20 October 2019. With the playoffs cancelled due to the COVID-19 Pandemic, Afanasyev's tenure with the Spitfires ended following the subsequent cancellation of the following 2020–21 season.

In order to continue his development, Afanasyev returned to his native Russia, securing a one-year contract with perennial contending Kontinental Hockey League club, CSKA Moscow on loan from the Predators. He made his professional debut in the 2020–21 season with CSKA, registering an impressive 2 goals and 6 points through limited ice-time in 16 regular season games. He played in all levels of CSKA's organization throughout the season, featuring in the VHL and MHL.

Returning to the Predators for the  season, Afanasyev was amongst the last cuts at training camp, assigned to begin his North American professional career with AHL affiliate, the Milwaukee Admirals.  In his rookie season, Afanasyev showed his offensive potential in collected 12 goals and 33 points through 74 regular season games.

In his final year of his entry-level contract, Afanasyev continued in the AHL to begin the  season. Deployed in a top-six scoring role, Afanasyev later received his first recall to the Nashville Predators on 12 March 2023. He was immediately inserted into the lineup that night and made his NHL debut in a 2–1 shootout victory over the Los Angeles Kings.

Career statistics

Regular season and playoffs

International

Awards and honours

References

External links

2001 births
Living people
HC CSKA Moscow players
Krasnaya Armiya (MHL) players
Milwaukee Admirals players
Muskegon Lumberjacks players
Nashville Predators draft picks
Nashville Predators players
Russian ice hockey forwards
Windsor Spitfires players
Zvezda Moscow players